Bradshaw is a village within the Metropolitan Borough of Calderdale, in West Yorkshire, England.

Buildings 

The parish church is dedicated to St John the Evangelist. It also has a primary school.

The church was built in 1838 at an expense of £1,200, two-thirds of which was given by Elizabeth Wadsworth who also erected a national school in the village.

Sport
The village has a cricket team, Bradshaw Cricket Club who play in the Halifax Cricket League.

References

Villages in West Yorkshire
Geography of Calderdale